"I've Been in Love Before" is a song by English rock band Cutting Crew. Written by lead singer Nick Van Eede, it was released as the second single from the band's debut album, Broadcast (1986). It reached No. 9 on the US Billboard Hot 100 the following year, making the song their second biggest hit in the United States.

Chart history

Weekly charts

Year-end charts

References

External links
 

1986 songs
1986 singles
Cutting Crew songs
Songs written by Nick Van Eede
Virgin Records singles
Rock ballads